The grey chi (Antitype chi) is a moth of the family Noctuidae. The species was first described by Carl Linnaeus in his 1758 10th edition of Systema Naturae. It is distributed throughout Europe, although it is not present in southern Spain and Greece, as well as northern Fennoscandia. It is also found across the Palearctic including Central Asia, to the Russian Far East but not in Japan.

This species has grey forewings speckled with black markings which vary in intensity (with the female generally more heavily marked than the male). There is usually a bold cross-shaped black mark in the centre of the wing which has been likened to the Greek letter chi (Χ) and gives the species its common name. The hindwings are white in the male, dirty grey in the female.

Technical description and variation

A. chi L. (33 i, 34 a). Forewing chalk white, grey-speckled; the lines double, grey; median area darker, the stigmata pale grey and conspicuous; the claviform at extremity edged with black and joined by a black dash to the inner blacker arm of outer line; submarginal line formed of whitish spots preceded by black wedge shaped marks; hindwing of male white with interrupted grey submarginal band; of female blackish grey, with darker cellspot, veins, and outer line; the females are always darker grey than the males; — olivacea Stph. (34 a) from Scotland is suffused throughout with olive grey; — subcaerulea Graes., from N. E. Amurland, is dark bluish grey in the forewing;- suitusa Robson is a dark grey form from the North of England, of which the males are equally dark with the females an extreme local development of this form from the neighbourhood of Huddersfield, Yorkshire, ab. nigrescens Tutt is nearly black; ab. langei Harrison (34 a) is like olivacea but the submarginal line is absent, and the black marks preceding it wholly or nearly obsolete. Larva green, finely dotted with yellow; dorsal and subdorsal lines whitish; spiracular line yellowish white, diffusely dark green above .

Biology
This moth flies at night in August and September and is attracted to light and sugar.

The larva feeds on the leaves and flowers of a variety of plants (see list below). The species overwinters as an egg.

The flight season refers to the British Isles. This may vary in other parts of the range.

Subspecies 
Antitype chi chi
Antitype chi subcaerulea (Graeser, 1889) (Russian Far East)

Recorded food plants 

 Artemisia - mugwort
 Convallaria - lily-of-the-valley
 Helianthus - Jerusalem artichoke
 Lactuca - lettuce
 Lathyrus - meadow vetchling
 Lychnis - campion
 Ribes - blackcurrant
 Rumex
 Salix - willow
 Saxifraga - saxifrage
 Sedum - stonecrop
 Silene - campion
 Sonchus - sow thistle
 Taraxacum - dandelion
 Triglochin
 Urtica - stinging nettle
 Viburnum - guelder rose
See.

References 

Chinery, Michael (1986, reprinted 1991). Collins Guide to the Insects of Britain and Western Europe.
Skinner, Bernard (1984). The Colour Identification Guide to Moths of the British Isles.

External links

 Taxonomy
Fauna Europaea
Lepiforum e.V.

Antitype (moth)
Moths described in 1758
Moths of Europe
Moths of Asia
Taxa named by Carl Linnaeus